The Dirty Dozen: Next Mission is a 1985 made-for-TV film and sequel to the original 1967 film Dirty Dozen, directed by Andrew V. McLaglen and reuniting Lee Marvin, Ernest Borgnine and Richard Jaeckel 18 years after the original hit war film. Marvin returns to lead an all-new dirty dozen on a mission to assassinate an SS General played by Wolf Kahler.

Plot
In German occupied France in September 1944, Waffen-SS General Dietrich (Wolf Kahler) plots with other high-ranking Nazi officials to make a second attempt on Hitler's life.

In England, Major General Worden (Ernest Borgnine) learns of the plot through the French Resistance. He and other Allied generals are worried that if Dietrich assassinates Hitler, capable Nazi commanders will continue the war beyond 1945. Worden considers Hitler "their best ally," because his incompetence as a military commander is "paralyzing his own army."

In the meantime, Major John Reisman (Lee Marvin) is on trial for hijacking a shipment of steaks intended for high-ranking American officers, when Worden summons him and tells him that he is to again train twelve convicted US soldiers for a suicide mission: namely, to assassinate General Dietrich before he can assassinate Hitler. Reisman considers the idea of stopping Dietrich ludicrous, but Worden leaves him little choice, threatening to send him right back to trial if he does not cooperate.

Reisman returns to Marston Tyne Military Prison to select a new Dirty Dozen, again with the help of MP Sergeant Clyde Bowren (Richard Jaeckel). He initially selects thirteen prisoners — a baker's dozen: Sixkiller, Dregors, Deutsch, Valentine, Wright, Wells, Perkins, Le Clair, Rosen, Anderson, Baxley, Reynolds and Sanders.

Reisman and Bowren gather the selected soldiers together at a disused train station. Initially, there are thirteen of them but Rosen is insubordinate and Reisman has him taken back to prison, bringing the number back down to twelve. He trains the group how to storm a train, assault the guards, and find and kill Dietrich. Initially they train only with wooden guns and rubber grenades but when General Worden informs Reisman that their schedule has been bumped up, Reisman gives the men real guns. There is mild strife when, during a German air raid, convict Louis Valentine (Ken Wahl) attempts to escape. However, Sixkiller and Wells capture him and beat him up before bringing him back and explaining to Reisman he was merely sleepwalking.

Dressed as elite German soldiers, Reisman and the Dozen (this time without Sergeant Bowren, who remains behind) fly to a German-held French airfield and land, where they will take a bus. Realizing a Wehrmacht soldier who was black would give them away, Reisman has Dregors bandage his face as though wounded. However his hands are bare, and a Gestapo agent notices them and sounds an alarm, forcing the Dozen to escape in the bus. The Gestapo agent and several German soldiers pursue them.

During the chase, Wright attempts to murder Reisman but instead is shot and killed by Sixkiller. The bus driver is killed, causing a crash that claims the life of Anderson. However, they manage to fend off their pursuers with grenades. Hiking through the French countryside, they find a bullet-riddled Nazi staff car and get it running, though it later breaks down.

Because of the bus crash, they are behind schedule and Dietrich's train has already left. All of the group (except Sixkiller and Wells) want to scrap the mission, Reisman however tells his men that there is a shipment of gold aboard the train, prompting them to change their minds. They agree to continue the mission, while resting in a cellar they encounter a German patrol that ends badly because, like the Gestapo agent at the airport, the lieutenant in command notices Dregors and a firefight starts, during which Perkins, Sanders and Baxley are wounded.

Aboard the train, Dietrich discovers that his longtime second-in-command Colonel Schmidt is suspicious of his motives. Fearing that Schmidt will out him as a traitor, Dietrich shoots and kills the other officer. The train arrives at a depot where it is met by hundreds of German troops. Arriving and taking shelter behind a stone wall, the Dozen watch in puzzlement. Reisman reveals he lied about the gold, angering his men. They wonder, then, if there is no treasure, why are there so many soldiers just to meet one general. They get their answer when a plane lands carrying none other than Adolf Hitler himself.

Dregors contemplates disobeying orders and shooting Hitler instead of Dietrich. Reisman however tells him if he kills Hitler, the war will just "go on and on." So, Dregors follows orders and shoots Dietrich with a sniper rifle. Chaos follows as Nazi officers bundle Hitler into a car and escape, while the soldiers attack the Dozen, who, rather than flee, recklessly attack the train, believing it to indeed contain treasure. It does contain treasure of a sort — priceless paintings and Beethoven's original piano — but these items are much too large to take with them amidst all the fighting.

They escape in the plane Hitler arrived in. During the run for the plane, everyone except for Reisman, Dregors, Perkins, Valentine and Wells (who's piloting it) are killed, although Dregors is shot in the stomach. During the trip back, Dregors dies from his wounds, and Reisman finds a briefcase tucked under a seat, containing top-secret intelligence information as well as a bag of jewels, which he agrees to split with the three remaining men.

The plane develops engine problems as they approach England but Wells manages to land them safely. Still in their uniforms, they depart, and are held at gunpoint by a farmer who thinks they are Nazis, until Reisman speaks English. The farmer tells them of a good pub in the nearby town, and Reisman agrees to buy them all a round of drinks.

Cast
 Lee Marvin as Major John Reisman
 Ernest Borgnine as Major General Sam Worden
 Richard Jaeckel as Sergeant Clyde Bowren
 Ken Wahl as Louis Valentine
 Sonny Landham as Sam Sixkiller
 Larry Wilcox as Tommy Wells
 Ricco Ross as Arlen Dregors
 Gavan O'Herlihy as Conrad E. Perkins
 Jay Benedict as Didier Le Clair
 Stephen Hattersley as Otto Deutsch
 Rolf Saxon as Robert E. Wright
 Wolf Kahler as General Sepp Dietrich
 Bruce Boa as a US Colonel
 Don Fellows as General Trent Tucker
 Michael Sheard as Adolf Hitler

The New Dozen
 Sam Sixkiller (Sonny Landham). Sentenced to death by hanging, a Native American GI who has managed to win nearly every medal going, but on the downside he's been imprisoned for numerous offences including drunk on duty and going AWOL.
 Arlen Dregors (Ricco Ross). Sentenced to death by hanging, a black soldier and former Philadelphia police detective who murdered a white lieutenant who had raped a French girl. His marksmanship skills make Reisman choose him to be the team's sniper.
 Otto Deutsch (Stephen Hattersley). Sentenced to death by hanging, a German-born American citizen who killed a sergeant in a bar brawl because the other soldier had called him a "fat kraut." He had been drinking after receiving news that anti-German protesters had bombed his family's bakery, resulting in the death of his sister. Otto demands the right to "die like an American soldier," a right Reisman promises him.
 Louis Valentine (Ken Wahl). Sentenced to 30 years hard labour, an embittered jazz musician who sees the world as being against him. He's also a racist bigot who regularly clashes with Dregors until they both see combat.
 Robert E. Wright (Rolf Saxon). Sentenced to death by hanging, a rapist who murdered a woman who, he claims, "liked it." Reisman barely contains his disdain for Wright, prompting Wright to attack Reisman. Reisman subdues the convict, putting him in his place. Wright silently vows to kill Reisman the first chance he gets.
 Tommy Wells (Larry Wilcox). a Southern crop duster pilot who collected 'souvenirs' from dead German soldiers. He expresses disdain at being "caged up," and, much like Otto, wants nothing more than to prove his worth in battle. Despite Reisman being impressed with the former pilot's zeal, he soon works out that Wells isn't the cleverest member of the group.
 Conrad E. Perkins (Gavan O'Herlihy). Sentenced to 30 years hard labour, imprisoned for robbery from the corpses of dead American soldiers. Reisman vows to kill Perkins himself at first. Along with Wright and Valentine, Perkins is one of the main troublemakers in the dozen.
 Didier Le Clair (Jay Benedict), and Gary Rosen (Russell Sommers). are both deserters, with Le Clair deserting from the French Army and being sentenced to death by hanging. Rosen, Sentenced to 20 years hard labour, departs the group early and is returned to prison after complaining about the training conditions. The group is completed by GIs Anderson, Baxley, Reynolds and Sanders.

References

External links
 
 
 

1985 television films
1985 films
American action television films
Films directed by Andrew McLaglen
Films set in 1944
Television sequel films
War adventure films
World War II films based on actual events
American World War II films
Films about the United States Army
Films scored by Richard Harvey
1980s American films
Cultural depictions of Adolf Hitler
World War II television films